John M. Grimm (December 21, 1866 – December 22, 1943) was a justice of the Iowa Supreme Court from February 1, 1929, to September 15, 1932, appointed from Linn County, Iowa.

References

External links

Justices of the Iowa Supreme Court
1866 births
1943 deaths